Dikleh Rural District is in the Central District of Hurand County, East Azerbaijan province, Iran. At the National Census of 2006, its population was 4,017 in 863 households, when it was in Hurand District of Ahar County. There were 3,602 inhabitants in 924 households at the following census of 2011. At the most recent census of 2016, the population of the rural district was 3,090 in 923 households. The largest of its 24 villages was Moradlu, with 512 people. Hurand District was separated from Ahar County to establish Hurand County.

References 

Rural Districts of East Azerbaijan Province

Populated places in East Azerbaijan Province